Political Marxism (PM) is a strand of Marxist theory that places history at the centre of its analysis. It is also referred to as neo-Marxism.

History 
The term political Marxism itself was coined during the Brenner debate of the late 1970s as a criticism of the work of Brenner by the French Marxist historian Guy Bois. Bois distinguished Brenner's "political Marxism" from "economic Marxism". As such, the label political Marxism has not always been accepted by the scholars to whom it has been applied. The term is also distinguished from Marxism in the politically activist sense. According to Arnold Hauser, in this system of analysis, one can agree with Marxism as a philosophy of history and society without being a Marxist. 

Political Marxism was developed as a reaction against historical models of Marxist analysis in the debate on the origins of capitalism. The political Marxist critique brought social agency and class conflict to the centre of Marxism. In this context, Robert Brenner and Ellen Wood developed political Marxism as a distinct approach to rehistoricize and repoliticize the Marxist project. It was a movement away from structuralist and timeless accounts towards historical specificity as contested process and lived praxis. This research programme has since expanded across the social sciences to include the fields of history, political theory, political economy, sociology, international relations, and international political economy.

Researchers linked with political Marxism today include Benno Teschke, Hannes Lacher, and George Comninel. The theory started to decline during the late 1950s until the second half of the 1970s.

References

Further reading
By Robert Brenner:
(1976) 'Agrarian Class Structures and Economic Development in Pre-Industrial Europe'.  Past & Present, 70, (February 1976), pp. 30-75. 
(1977) 'The Origins of Capitalist Development: A Critique of Neo-Smithian Marxism'. New Left Review, I/104. pp. 25-92.
(1995 [1982]) 'The Agrarian Roots of European Capitalism' in Aston, T.H. and C.H.E. Philpin (eds.) The Brenner Debate: Agrarian Class Structure and Economic Development in Pre-Industrial Europe. Cambridge: Cambridge University Press. pp. 213-327. Originally published (1982). ’The Agrarian Roots of European Capitalism’, Past & Present, 97, November, pp. 16-113.

By Ellen Meiksins Wood:
(1991)  The Pristine Culture of Capitalism: An Historical Essay on Old Regimes and Modern States. London and New York: Verso.
 (1995) Democracy Against Capitalism: Renewing Historical Materialism. Cambridge: Cambridge University Press.
 (2002 [1999]) The Origin of Capitalism: A Longer View. London and New York: Verso.
  (2008) Citizens to Lords. A Social History of Western Political Thought From Antiquity to the Middle Ages. London and New York: Verso.

External links
 Political Marxism and the Social Sciences, a platform for research on political Marxism at the University of Sussex
  The Limits of 'Political Marxism'. By Alex Callinicos. New Left Review I/184, November–December 1990.

Eponymous political ideologies
Marxist theory